The short-nosed snake (Elapognathus minor) is a species of venomous snake in the family Elapidae. The species is endemic to Australia. Short-nosed snakes are endemic to swamplands and coastlands in the southwest of Western Australia, where they shelter in nests of stick ants (Iridomyrmex conifer), as well as dense rushes and reed tussocks. Short-nosed snakes are known to prey on small skinks mainly from the skink genus hemiergis, and small species of frogs.

References

Further reading
Boulenger GA. 1896. Catalogue of the Snakes in the British Museum (Natural History).Volume III., Containing the Colubridæ (Opisthoglyphæ and Proteroglyphæ) ... London: Trustees of the British Museum (Natural History). (Taylor and Francis, printers). xiv + 727 pp. + Plates I-XXV. (Elapognathus minor, new combination, pp. 356–357 + Plate XIX, figure 2).
Günther A. 1863. "Third Account of new Species of Snakes in the Collection of the British Museum". Ann. Mag. Nat. Hist., Third Series 12: 348–365. (Hoplocephalus minor, new species, pp. 362–363).

External links
Keogh JS, Scott IA, Scanlon JD. 2000. "Molecular phylogeny of viviparous Australian elapid snakes: affinities of Echiopsis atriceps (Storr, 1980) and Drysdalia coronata (Schlegel, 1837), with description of a new genus". J. Zool. 252: 317-326.

Elapognathus
Reptiles of Western Australia
Reptiles described in 1863
Taxa named by Albert Günther
Taxonomy articles created by Polbot